Last Rights is a British television political thriller drama, written by Clive Bradley and directed by Bill Anderson, which first aired on Channel 4. Despite the subject matter, all three episodes were broadcast back-to-back from 9am on 24 March 2005, as part of a strand of programming aired towards the run-up to the 2005 UK General Election.

The series stars Philip Glenister as John Speers, a spin-doctor and right-hand man to the newly elected prime minister, Richard Wheeler (Charles Dance), who tries to prevent the leak of potentially sensitive confidential information when his laptop is stolen by a young tearaway. The series also co-starred Ashley Walters, Iddo Goldberg, Stephen Graham and Colin McFarlane. Aside from a single rerun during the T4 strand of programming in 2006, the series has never been repeated since and has never been released on DVD. Due to the timeslot of broadcast, no viewing figures were recorded for any of the three episodes.

Plot
London, 2009. Voter apathy is at an all-time high in the United Kingdom, and a new right-wing political party, The Democratic Consensus Party, led by Richard Wheeler, have just been voted into office. Unbeknownst to the public, the DCP have a sinister hidden agenda to do away with democracy and turn the country into a police state.  John Speers panics when just days after being appointed as Wheeler's right-hand-man and spin-doctor, his laptop is stolen by Tariq, a young tearaway. Concerned that the laptop contains potentially sensitive and confidential information, Speers sets about trying to recover it. Meanwhile, Tariq's best friend, Max is concerned when he suddenly disappears without trace. Max finds himself unwittingly drawn into a dangerous world of corruption and political conspiracy as he goes in search of his missing friend. Max subsequently discovers information which threatens to ruin the government's plans, but will he realise its significance in time?

Cast
 Philip Glenister as Speers
 Charles Dance as Wheeler
 Ashley Walters as Max
 Kiera Malik as Melissa 
 Sonnell Dadral as Tariq
 Iddo Goldberg as Sol
 Stephen Graham as Steve
 Colin McFarlane as Don
 Mamta Kaash as Shahida
 Raquel Cassidy as Nadine
 Francesca Fowler as Liz
 Niall Refoy as Brown
 Paul Rattray as Pete
 Martin Walsh as Dermot
 Anthony Oseyemi as Jameel
 Olivia Scott as Zara
 Jaimi Barbakoff as Sheryl
 Jon Snow as Himself

External links

References

2005 British television series debuts
2005 British television series endings
2000s British drama television series
Channel 4 original programming
British thriller television series
Fiction set in 2009
2000s British television miniseries
English-language television shows
Television shows set in London